Souad is a 2020 Egyptian drama film directed by Ayten Amin. It was selected to be shown at the 2020 Cannes Film Festival. It was selected as the Egyptian entry for the Best International Feature Film at the 94th Academy Awards.

Plot
In Zagazig, a teenage girl experiences a conflict between her social media use and the constraints of traditional religion.

See also
 List of submissions to the 94th Academy Awards for Best International Feature Film
 List of Egyptian submissions for the Academy Award for Best International Feature Film

References

External links
 

2020 films
2020 drama films
Egyptian drama films
2020s Arabic-language films